Lehigh Township is the name of some places in the U.S. state of Pennsylvania:

Lehigh Township, Carbon County, Pennsylvania
Lehigh Township, Lackawanna County, Pennsylvania, now Thornhurst Township
Lehigh Township, Northampton County, Pennsylvania
Lehigh Township, Wayne County, Pennsylvania

Pennsylvania township disambiguation pages